Ashburnham County, New South Wales is one of the 141 Cadastral divisions of New South Wales. The Lachlan River and Belubula River is the southern boundary. It includes Parkes and Forbes.

Ashburnham County was named in honour of Bertram Ashburnham (1797-1878), who became the 4th earl of Ashburnham in 1830.

Parishes within this county
A full list of parishes found within this county; their current LGA and mapping coordinates to the approximate centre of each location is as follows:

References

Counties of New South Wales